2012 UEFA Women's U-19 Championship First Qualifying Round was the first round of qualifications for the Final Tournament of 2012 UEFA Women's U-19 Championship. They were played in September 2011. 40 teams were split into 10 groups of 4 and teams in each group played each other once. Turkey received a bye to the final as host. The top two teams in each group and the best third-placed team entered the 2012 UEFA Women's U-19 Championship Second qualifying round to join England, France and Germany.

The host of each mini tournament is listed in italics.

Groups
The draw was made on 16 November 2010 at UEFA headquarters in Nyon.

Group 1

Group 2

Group 3

Group 4

Group 5 
In group 5 Serbia advanced having the better goal difference (+1) over Ukraine (0) and Slovakia (−1) in direct matches.

Group 6

Group 7

Group 8

Group 9 
In group 9 Northern Ireland qualified for the Second qualification round as best third-place finishers.

Group 10

Ranking of third-placed teams
In the ranking of the third-place finishers, only the results against the top two teams count. Northern Ireland were the best runners-ups and advanced.

References

External links
UEFA.com; official website

1
2012 first
UEFA
2012 in youth sport